Boilerplate text, or simply boilerplate, is any written text (copy) that can be reused in new contexts or applications without significant changes to the original. The term is used about statements, contracts, and computer code, and is used in the media to refer to hackneyed or unoriginal writing.

Etymology
"Boiler plate" originally referred to the rolled steel used to make boilers to heat water. Metal printing plates (type metal) used in hot metal typesetting of prepared text such as advertisements or syndicated columns were distributed to small, local newspapers, and became known as 'boilerplates' by analogy. One large supplier to newspapers of this kind of boilerplate was the Western Newspaper Union, which supplied "ready-to-print stories [which] contained national or international news" to papers with smaller geographic footprints, which could include advertisements pre-printed next to the conventional content.

Boilerplate language

In contract law, the term "boilerplate language" or "boilerplate clause" describes the parts of a contract that are considered standard. A standard form contract or boilerplate contract is a contract between two parties, where the terms and conditions of the contract are set by one of the parties, and the other party has little or no ability to negotiate more favorable terms and is thus placed in a "take it or leave it" position.

Boilerplate language may also exist in pre-created form letters. The person sending the form letter then usually only needs to add his or her name at the end of the pre-written greeting and body.

Boilerplate code 

In computer programming, boilerplate is the sections of code that have to be included in many places with little or no alteration. Such boilerplate code is particularly salient when the programmer must include a lot of code for minimal functionality.

A related phenomenon, bookkeeping code, is code that is not part of the business logic, but is interleaved with it to keep data structures updated or able to handle secondary aspects of the program.

Boilerplate statement
A boilerplate statement or response generally refers to a message used with minimal effort for multiple different situations. Examples include official statements from government officials like "Our thoughts and prayers go to those affected" or messages left by companies' staff like "Thank you for contacting us. Most issues are solved by going to our website."

See also
 Clipboard manager
 Library (computer science)
 Snippet management
 Template processors are used to generate boilerplate text automatically
 Transpromotional

References

External links
Example of a boiler plate

Computer jargon
Source code
Articles with example C code
Articles with example Perl code
Informal legal terminology